The 151st Regiment Illinois Volunteer Infantry was an infantry regiment that served in the Union Army during the American Civil War.

Service
The 151st Illinois Infantry was organized at Quincy, Illinois, and mustered into Federal service on February 23, 1865, for a one-year enlistment.  The 151st served in garrisons in  Georgia.

The regiment mustered out February 8, 1866.

Total strength and casualties 
The regiment had 51 enlisted men who died of disease.

Commanders
Colonel French B. Woodall - mustered out with the regiment.

See also
List of Illinois Civil War Units
Illinois in the American Civil War

Notes

References
The Civil War Archive

Units and formations of the Union Army from Illinois
Military units and formations established in 1865
1865 establishments in Illinois
Military units and formations disestablished in 1866
1866 disestablishments in Illinois